International Association for Energy Economics (IAEE) is an international non-profit society of professionals interested in energy economics. IAEE was founded in 1977, during the period of the energy crisis. IAEE is incorporated under United States laws and has headquarters in Cleveland.

The IAEE operates through a 17-member Council of elected and appointed members. Council and officer members serve in a voluntary position.

IAEE has over 4,500 members worldwide (in over 100 countries). There are more than 25 national chapters, in countries where membership exceeds 25 individual members. Some of the regularly active national chapters of the IAEE are; USAEE - United States; GEE - Germany; BIEE - Great Britain; AEE - France; AIEE - Italy.

Publications 
The International Association for Energy Economics publishes three publications throughout the year:

 The Energy Journal, a quarterly academic publication 
 the Economics of Energy & Environmental Policy, a semi-annual publication
 the Energy Forum

Conferences 
The IAEE conferences address critical issues of vital concern and importance to governments and industries and provide a forum where policy issues are presented, considered and discussed at both formal sessions and informal social functions.

IAEE typically holds five Conferences each year. The main annual conference for IAEE is the IAEE International Conference which is organized at diverse locations around the world. From the year 1996 on these conferences have taken place (or will take place) in the following cities:

 2018 - Groningen, The Netherlands
 2017 - Singapore
 2016 - Bergen, Norway
 2015 - Antalya, Turkey
 2014 - New York City, United States
 2013 - Daegu, South Korea
 2012 - Perth, Australia (35th)
 2011 - Stockholm, Sweden
 2010 - Rio, Brazil
 2009 - San Francisco, United States
 2008 - Istanbul, Turkey
 2007 - Wellington, New Zealand
 2006 - Potsdam, Germany
 2005 - Taipei, China (Taipei)
 2003 - Prague, Czech Republic
 2002 - Aberdeen, Scotland
 2001 - Houston, Texas
 2000 - Sydney, Australia
 1999 - Rome, Italy
 1998 - Quebec, Canada
 1997 - New Delhi, India
 1996 - Budapest, Hungary

Other annual IAEE conferences are the North American Conference and the European Conference.

IAEE Awards 
The Association's Immediate Past President annually chairs the Awards committee that selects the award recipients.

 Outstanding Contributions to the Profession
 Outstanding Contributions to the IAEE
 The Energy Journal Campbell Watkins Best Paper Award
 Economics of Energy & Environmental Policy Best Paper Award
 Journalism Award

References

External links
http://www.iaee.org/en/
https://web.archive.org/web/20180630070552/http://saudiaee.org/
http://www.usaee.org/
The Distinguished Lecturer Series
IAEE Newsletter

Energy economics